Philobota chionoptera is a moth of the family Oecophoridae. It was first described by Edward Meyrick 1884. It is found in Australia and New Zealand.

References

Oecophoridae
Moths described in 1884
Taxa named by Edward Meyrick
Moths of New Zealand
Moths of Australia